Şağlazüzə (also, Şaqlazüzə) is a village and municipality in the Astara Rayon of Azerbaijan. It has a population of 1,299.  The municipality consists of the villages of Şağlazüzə, Siyakeş, Şıxməhlə and Həsin.

References

Populated places in Astara District